Pinacopteryx is a monotypic genus of pierid butterflies found in Africa containing Pinacopteryx eriphia, the zebra white.

The wingspan is 40–55 mm in males and 42–47 mm in females. Its flight period is year-round.

Larvae feed on Maerua cafra, Boscia species, Capparis oleoides, and Maerua triphylla.

Subspecies
Pinacopteryx eriphia eriphia (Godart, [1819]) (South Africa, Zimbabwe, Botswana, Mozambique, Malawi, southern Tanzania)
Pinacopteryx eriphia mabillei (Aurivillius, [1898]) (Madagascar)
Pinacopteryx eriphia melanarge (Butler, 1886) (southern Sudan, southern Ethiopia, central Ethiopia, Somalia, Kenya, northern Uganda, northern Tanzania)
Pinacopteryx eriphia tritogenia (Klug, 1829) (Mauritania to Senegal, Upper Volta, Niger, Chad, Sudan, northern Ethiopia, Arabia)
Pinacopteryx eriphia wittei Berger, 1940 (western Uganda, north-eastern DRC)

References

External links
 Seitz, A. Die Gross-Schmetterlinge der Erde 13: Die Afrikanischen Tagfalter. Plate XIII 10
images representing Pinacopteryx at Consortium for the Barcode of Life

Teracolini
Taxa named by Hans Daniel Johan Wallengren
Monotypic butterfly genera
Pieridae genera